Gentle Offoin (born 19 August 1973) is a Nigerian former swimmer, who specialized in sprint freestyle events. He held a Nigerian record in the 100 m freestyle, and later represented Nigeria at the 2000 Summer Olympics.

Offoin competed only in the men's 100 m freestyle at the 2000 Summer Olympics in Sydney. He received a Universality place from FINA, in an entry time of 53.08. He challenged seven other swimmers in heat three, including Trinidad and Tobago's 16-year-old George Bovell and Seychelles' three-time Olympian Kenny Roberts. He cleared a 53-second barrier, and established a Nigerian record of 52.91 to race for a sixth seed, finishing behind Bovell by a hundredth of a second (0.01). Offoin failed to advance into the semifinals, as he placed sixtieth overall in the prelims.

References

1973 births
Living people
Nigerian male freestyle swimmers
Olympic swimmers of Nigeria
Swimmers at the 2000 Summer Olympics